Garraa dulongensis is a species of ray-finned fish from the family Cyprinidae, the carps and minnows, which is found only in China. Fishbase places it in the genus Garra but Eschmeyer places it in Placocheilus.

References

Fish described in 2006
Freshwater fish of China
Cyprinid fish of Asia
Garra